More Fire Crew is an East London-based English grime crew from Waltham Forest, whose 2002 single "Oi!" with Platinum 45 was widely recognised as the first grime song to reach the UK Singles Chart, peaking at number eight.

Background
While enrolled on a sound engineering training programme, Ozzie B first met Neeko, who was at the time a member of an existing crew called Mad Dog. Together, the pair established More Fire Crew, its name an homage to the album by Jamaican dancehall deejay Capleton which had been released shortly beforehand. The duo were soon joined by Lethal Bizzle, with whom they had attended secondary school, and their friend Seani B, who was a DJ on Amy FM. They initially gained recognition as the hosts of a show on Deja Vu FM, one of London's biggest pirate radio stations at the time.

The group are best known for their 2002 single "Oi!", which reached number eight on the UK Singles Chart, making it the first grime song to achieve chart success. In 2002, their debut studio album, More Fire Crew CV, was released, and they contributed a cover of Gabrielle's "Dreams" to the album NME & Warchild Presents 1 Love. In the same year they were dropped by their record label, with Lethal setting up his own eponymous record label and going on to a successful solo career.

In 2004, Bizzle enlisted in Ozzie B and Neeko among others to feature on his eight-bar rally track "Pow! (Forward)", with the group's three members credited as individuals rather than collectively. The song was another chart success for the trio, reaching number eleven in the UK, but was banned from many clubs at the time due to its controversially violent lyrics. It eventually went on to become what music journalist Dan Hancox described in a Guardian article as the "unofficial soundtrack" to the 2011 student protests against a rise in tuition fees under the incumbent coalition government. However, a falling out between Lethal Bizzle and Neeko related to the song's lyrics culminated in the disbandment of the trio shortly after its release. Lethal Bizzle and Ozzie B formed a successor crew known as Fire Camp, alongside MCs such as 2Face, Knowl£dg£ and Clipson.

During the COVID-19 pandemic, Ozzie B, Neeko and Seani B reformed the group for a series of 'More Fire Show' sets streamed on Instagram Live alongside special guests including Pay As U Go's Maxwell D and Aftershock's Bruza. Their comeback single under the More Fire banner, a collaboration with Doller and Fumin entitled "Tek", was released on 1 September 2021 via independent label Rosebank.

Members
Lethal Bizzle - MC
Neeko - MC
Ozzie B - MC
Seani B - DJ
Commander B - DJ
Gappy Ryder
Twister

Discography

Studio albums

Singles

References

External links
Interview from The Situation
Designer Magazine interview
Artist Page On Blaxtalion Talents' Website
GMTA Website

Grime music groups
English hip hop groups
Musical groups established in 2000
Musical groups disestablished in 2005
Musical groups from London
British musical trios
Go! Beat artists